Barthélemy Chasse (1659-1720) was an Italian-born French painter.

Biography

Early life 
Barthélemy Chasse was born in 1659 in Naples, Italy.

Career 
He moved to Marseille, where he became a religious painter. He sometimes worked alongside painter Michel Serre (1658-1733). He soon became the official painter of Bishop Henri François Xavier de Belsunce de Castelmoron (1671-1755). He painted three paintings for the Bishop's personal collection: Le déluge, La sortie de l'arche and Le sacrifice de Noé.

Some of his paintings can be found in Roman Catholic churches, mostly in or around Marseille. For example, four of his paintings are displayed in the Église Notre-Dame-du-Mont in Marseille: La fuite en Égypte, L'atelier de Nazareth, L'adoration des bergers and Le mariage de la Vierge. Additionally, his painting La Vierge, Saint-Sébastien, et Saint Clair is displayed in the Église Saint-Sébastien in Allauch

More of his paintings are displayed in the Musée des beaux-arts de Marseille.

Personal life 
He got married in Marseille in 1689. He died in 1720 in Marseille.

References 

1659 births
1720 deaths
17th-century Neapolitan people
Artists from Marseille
Italian emigrants to France
17th-century Italian painters
Italian male painters
18th-century Italian painters
17th-century French painters
French male painters
18th-century French painters
18th-century French male artists
18th-century Italian male artists